Maksim Sergeyevich Fedin (born 8 June 1996) is a Kazakh professional footballer who plays as a midfielder for Ordabasy.

Career

Club

Bayterek Astana
Fedin passed the youth school of Irtysh Pavlodar. For the 2014 season, he made 26 appearances and scored 3 goals, playing with Bayterek.

Spartak Subotica
Fedin joined Spartak Subotica in January 2015, but he could not playing until the end of 2014–15 season, because of injury. He made his SuperLiga debut in the 7th fixture of 2015–16 season, against Metalac.

Atyrau
On 9 July 2016, Fedin signed for Kazakhstan Premier League side FC Atyrau.

Okzhetpes
On 12 January 2017, Fedin signed a one-year contract with FC Okzhetpes.

Tobol
On 25 December 2018, FC Tobol announced the signing of Fedin, with Fedin extending his contract with Tobol until the end of 2020 on 31 December 2019.

On 4 April 2020, Fedin joined FC Kaisar on loan for the remainder of the 2020 season.

Turan
In January 2022, Fedin joined Turan, before leaving by mutual agreement in June 2022.

Ordabasy
On 15 July 2022, Ordabasy announced the signing of Fedin.

International
Maksim Fedin was a regular member of all youth sections of the Kazakh national team, namely the U17, U19 and U21. On June 10, 2017, he was part of the Kazakhstan national football team in a qualifying game for the 2018 FIFA World Cup against Denmark, but ended being an unused substitute. He received a new call for the friendly game against Azerbaijan played on June 5, 2018, but again failed to debut. He made his debut for the senior squad on 13 October 2018 in a 2018–19 UEFA Nations League D game against Latvia.

Career statistics

Club

International

Statistics accurate as of match played 28 March 2021

International goals
Scores and results list Kazakhstan's goal tally first.

References

External links
 
 Maxim Fedin stats at utakmica.rs
 
 

1996 births
Living people
Association football midfielders
Kazakhstani footballers
Kazakhstani expatriate footballers
Kazakhstan under-21 international footballers
Kazakhstan international footballers
FC Bayterek players
FK Spartak Subotica players
FC Atyrau players
FC Tobol players
FC Aktobe players
FC Turan players
Serbian SuperLiga players
Kazakhstan Premier League players
Kazakhstani expatriate sportspeople in Serbia
Expatriate footballers in Serbia